Lucien-Hubert Borne (20 August 1884 – 23 December 1954) was a Canadian politician, serving as mayor of Quebec City from 1938 to 1953.

In 1936, Borne made an unsuccessful attempt to become a Liberal member of the Legislative Assembly of Quebec. Also in 1936, he made an unsuccessful first bid for the office of Quebec City's Mayor. Two years later, he defeated incumbent mayor Joseph-Ernest Grégoire and began a 15-year mayoralty career, through city elections in 1940, 1942, 1944, 1947 and 1950. He succeeded in attracting significant industrial development during his term in office, including the development of eight new industrial parks. Borne also promoted the replacement of streetcars with buses in Quebec city's transit system.

Borne resigned as mayor in November 1953 due to a heart condition and died the following year. He was survived by two daughters and two sons; his wife predeceased him.

Named after him in Québec are : rue Borne (named in 1955), centre Lucien-Borne and parc Lucien-Borne (named in 1991).

References

External links
  City of Quebec: Lucien-Borne, parc

1884 births
1954 deaths
Mayors of Quebec City